Radiosarajevo.ba is popular web portal in Bosnia and Herzegovina. It was founded in 2004 as web portal for newly established commercial radio station in Sarajevo, Radio Sarajevo 90.2.

Former Radio Zid - Sarajevo (89.9 FM MHz) changed its name to current Radio Sarajevo).

The new name of the portal and the radio station reminds on the history of the former national public radio station in Bosnia and Herzegovina, 1945-1992, called Radio Sarajevo. Today, its legal successor is national public broadcasting service, BHRT via BH Radio 1.

See also 
 Radio Sarajevo
 Radio Sarajevo 90,2
 Media in Sarajevo
 Media of Bosnia and Herzegovina

Notes

External links 
 
 Press Council of BiH
 RadioSarajevo.ba on Facebook.

Bosnia and Herzegovina news websites
2004 establishments in Bosnia and Herzegovina